Nina Valeryevna Petushkova (born 18 May 1992) is a Russian former competitive figure skater. She is the 2008 Russian silver medalist. She was born in Kyiv, Ukraine, and made her senior international debut at the 2007 Cup of Russia, where she placed sixth.

Programs

Competitive highlights 
GP: Grand Prix; JGP: Junior Grand Prix

References

External links

 
 Nina Petushkova at Tracings.net

Russian female single skaters
Sportspeople from Kyiv
Living people
1992 births
Ukrainian emigrants to Russia